WHME-TV (channel 46) is a religious television station in South Bend, Indiana, United States, serving as the flagship station of World Harvest Television. The station is owned by locally based Family Broadcasting Corporation (formerly known as LeSEA Broadcasting and later World Harvest Broadcasting), an organization founded by Assembly of God minister Lester Sumrall, whose sons are still active with the ministry. WHME's studios are located on Ironwood Road on the south side of South Bend, and its transmitter is located in Mishawaka.

History

WMSH-TV
The G & E Religious and Educational Broadcasting Corporation obtained a construction permit for a new television station on channel 46 in South Bend on April 10, 1973. The allocation had previously been used by WNDU-TV, when that station signed on the air on July 15, 1955; WNDU moved to its present channel 16 in 1957. G & E, representing 618 churches, took the call letters WMSH-TV and broke ground on studio facilities on May 27. The transmitter site would be located separately from the studios due to potential interference to WSBT radio. Intended to begin on September 1, 1973, channel 46 instead began telecasting in late July or on August 3, 1974.

Within less than a year of telecasting, financial problems developed at G & E. The station had a total of $2.5 million in debt against $1.8 million in assets. A court placed the company into receivership, after which 14 creditors sued to force channel 46 into bankruptcy. Three months later, two investors who held $18,000 in station-issued bonds sued G & E for selling securities without being registered with federal or state authorities, as well as omissions in statements made by the company; Secretary of State Larry Conrad then charged G & E head George McQueen with criminal misrepresentation.

Citing lack of funds, WMSH-TV went silent September 2, 1975. The bankruptcy case stretched into 1976 as several buyers expressed interest.

WHME-TV
In January 1977, rumors began to circulate that the Lester Sumrall Evangelistic Association was in negotiations to buy WMSH-TV from its trustee, Elkhart attorney Gordon MacKenzie. The rumors would be confirmed in March when the $496,000 sale was announced.
Sumrall closed on the purchase on July 21, and the newly renamed WHME-TV signed on the air on September 10, 1977; the station ran mostly religious programs, along with a blend of classic cartoons (such as Tom and Jerry, Bugs Bunny, The Rocky and Bullwinkle Show, The Little Rascals and The Flintstones), sitcoms from the 1950s, '60s and '70s (such as The Dick Van Dyke Show, The Brady Bunch, My Three Sons, Gomer Pyle, U.S.M.C., Gidget, The Adventures of Ozzie and Harriet, The Partridge Family and Leave It To Beaver), and some drama series (such as The Lone Ranger and The Adventures of Robin Hood). Cameras from the Sumrall stations in Indianapolis and Miami were brought to South Bend, as WMSH did not have any color cameras.

By 1978, the station ran cartoons from 7 to 9 a.m. on weekdays. WHME ran Christian programs such as The PTL Club, The 700 Club, and locally produced Christian programs from 9 a.m. to about 1 p.m. Secular general entertainment programs ran from 1 to 7 p.m. Then after 7 p.m., WHME ran repeats of The PTL Club, The 700 Club and some of the religious shows that aired on Sundays, along with locally produced Christian programs. Saturdays consisted of Christian-themed children's programs until 9 a.m., a blend of secular cartoons and sitcoms until noon or 1 p.m., and some other family-friendly programs until 5 p.m. Christian programming continued after 6 p.m. Saturday nights and all day on Sundays (featuring televangelists such as Jerry Falwell, Jimmy Swaggart and Oral Roberts, as well as the Catholic Mass from Notre Dame). The station began broadcasting on a 24-hour schedule by 1980.

In the early 1980s, WHME cut back its secular programming hours on weekdays to 2 to 7 p.m. By the early to mid-1980s, the morning cartoons returned and at that point it started running more recent children's programs on weekdays such as The Great Space Coaster, Scooby-Doo, Inspector Gadget, and by the early 1990s, The Disney Afternoon animation block. WHME-TV also aired the nationally syndicated evening news program, the Independent Network News. By the early 1990s, more sitcoms from the 1970s and 1980s (such as Happy Days, Laverne and Shirley and Family Ties) were added onto the schedule. In May 1996, WHME began carrying the Kids' WB program block within its afternoon lineup when W12BK channel 12, now WYGN-LD, switched to being a translator of ABC affiliate WBND-LP channel 58, but unlike other LeSEA-owned stations, it declined to carry prime time programming from the block's parent network, The WB (which instead affiliated with W69BT channel 69 in October 1999, now WMYS-LD, and later moved to WMWB-LP channel 25, now WCWW-LD). In the early 2000s, WHME decreased the number of cartoons on its schedule and replaced them with more sitcoms and drama series. Today, WHME continues to run a blend of classic television series each afternoon on weekdays.

Sports programming
WHME used to carry many regional college football and basketball games shown through ESPN Plus until the 2007 launch of the Big Ten Network. WHME currently serves as the South Bend home to Ball State University sports. WHME previously served as the South Bend affiliate of ESPN Regional Television's syndicated SEC Network (later SEC TV) until the August 2014 launch of the pay TV-exclusive SEC Network. The station also maintains its own sports division that broadcasts many high school football and basketball games from Michiana area teams, usually once weekly, along with local NAIA college games, such as Bethel and Grace. WHME's sports director is Chuck Freeby, who previously worked as a sports anchor at WNDU-TV.

Technical information

Subchannels
The station's digital signal is multiplexed:

Analog-to-digital conversion
WHME-TV shut down its analog signal, over UHF channel 46, on June 12, 2009, the official date in which full-power television stations in the United States transitioned from analog to digital broadcasts under federal mandate. The station's digital signal remained on its pre-transition UHF channel 48, using PSIP to display the station's virtual channel as its former UHF analog channel 46.

On March 8, 2011, WHME-TV received a construction permit to move its digital operations to its former analog allotment on channel 46, due to interference with WMLW-TV in Racine, Wisconsin (which transmits from Milwaukee), a station that also broadcast its digital signal on UHF channel 48, with both stations having signal conflicts on the edges of their market areas. The conflict was resolved in January 2018 when WMLW cashed in their spectrum in the 2016 FCC auction and moved to a channel share with their sister low-power station, though WHME moved to channel 36 in 2019 as a result of the spectrum repack.

Between 2012 and sometime in early 2013, digital subchannel 46.3 was leased to Aliento Vision, a family-oriented Spanish-language network. The subchannel previously carried no content besides a card listing the channel numbers, call letters and city of license, but added Light TV to its 46.3 subchannel.

Former translator
WHME-TV's signal was relayed on a repeater station serving the Chicago market, WHNW-LD (channel 18) in Gary, until the station's license was cancelled on August 25, 2017.

See also
Family Broadcasting Corporation
fetv
WHMB-TV
KWHE-TV

Notes

References

External links

HME-TV
Television channels and stations established in 1974
World Harvest Television affiliates
Ion Television affiliates
Grit (TV network) affiliates
Laff (TV network) affiliates
1974 establishments in Indiana